Gabriel Walsh was born in Dublin.  At the age of 15, while working as a waiter in the Shelbourne Hotel in Dublin he met Irish Opera singer Margaret Burke-Sheridan (1889–1958). This encounter would change his life. He would go on to become a prominent writer, publishing books and producing scripts for TV shows and movies.

Early years
Margaret Burke-Sheridan convinces his family to allow the teenager to move to the US to further his education. 
Walsh travels to New York to live with a host family where he completes his education.  Walsh attended the Lee Strasberg School of Acting in New York and L.A.

Career
Since the 1970s, Walsh has either been writing screen plays, acting, co-producing or writing for the Evening Echo 
newspaper in Cork.

In 1970, Walsh wrote the screen-play Quackser Fortune Has a Cousin in the Bronx which stars 
Gene Wilder as Quackser Fortune and Margot Kidder as Zazel Pierce.

Quackser Fortune grabbed the attention of Jean Renoir.  Gene Wilder, in his book Kiss Me Like A Stranger published 
by St Martin's Press, quotes the legendary French Director as saying "not since Chaplin have I come across such as character 
as this Quackser".

The movie received mixed reviews when it was first released in 1970. But in 1971, Walsh's screen play was nominated for best comedy written for the screen at the Writers Guild of America. In 2012, Quackser Fortune has a Cousin in the Bronx was listed in the Sunday Times as one of the top 100 Irish movies ever produced.

Film and TV work
Walsh appeared in a number of movies including Night Flowers in 1979, which he wrote and co-produced.  The film received the ecumenical award at the Montreal World Film Festival in 1979. Heaven's Gate 1981; The returning 1983 and featured in TV series Wild Wild West in 1970.

Plays
The author wrote several plays including "The Brandy Dancers" in 1978 and "Hearts" which was produced by Eric Morris Theatre in LA.

Books
In 2012, Gabriel Walsh's memoirs "Maggie's Breakfast", published by Poolbeg Publishing, about his "life-changing" encounter with Margaret Burke Sheridan, joined the best seller list. The book recounts his up-bringing in Dublin in 1940s and 1950s as one of ten children to the moment he departs to New York, barely literate, to live and be educated by his new guardians, Wall Street economists and investors, Emerson and Ruth Houghton Axe. The book's sequel "I Dream Alone", which covers the young boy's life at the Axe Castle in Tarrytown, Westchester County, New York, was published in 2013.

References
Notes

Sources
Irish Independent How breakfast at the Shelbourne changed this poor Dublin boy's life (2 Feb 2012)
Irish ExaminerBeginner's Pluck (25 Feb 2012)
IMDb.com The Night of the Fugitives (8 Nov 1968)
New York Times Night-Flowers (1979) Movie section New York Times
Montreal World Film Festival Night Flowers Prize of the Ecumenical Jury 1979 
New York Times Quackser Fortune has a Cousin in the Bronx

External links
 Kiss Me Like a Stranger, St Martins Press, 2006 Quote: page 123, 
Shock Cinema Magazine'Night Flowers Online Revue
Getty Images Gabriel Walsh in 1975
Irish Film The Irish in Film
IMDB Quackser Fortune Has a Cousin in the Bronx

Works
 Maggie's Breakfast (Poolbeg Publishing) 25 January 2012
 I Dream Alone (Poolbeg Publishing) 2013

Living people
Writers from Dublin (city)
Irish screenwriters
Irish male screenwriters
Irish male television actors
Year of birth missing (living people)